The T. S. Eliot Prize for Poetry is a prize that was, for many years, awarded by the Poetry Book Society (UK) to "the best collection of new verse in English first published in the UK or the Republic of Ireland" in any particular year. The Prize was inaugurated in 1993 in celebration of the Poetry Book Society's 40th birthday and in honour of its founding poet, T. S. Eliot. Since its inception, the prize money was donated by Eliot's widow, Mrs Valerie Eliot and more recently it has been given by the T. S. Eliot Estate.

The T. S. Eliot Foundation took over the running of the T. S. Eliot Prize in 2016, appointing as its new director Chris Holifield (formerly director of the Poetry Book Society), when the former Poetry Book Society charity had to be wound up, with its book club and company name taken over by book sales agency Inpress Ltd in Newcastle. Holifield retired at the end of June 2022 after 20 years in the post, being replaced by Mike Sims. At present, the prize money is £20,000, with each of nine runners-up receiving £1500 each, making it the United Kingdom's most valuable annual poetry competition. The Prize has been called "the most coveted award in poetry".

The shortlist for the Prize is announced in October of each year, and the 10 shortlisted poets take part in the Readings at the Royal Festival Hall in London's Southbank Centre on the evening before the announcement of the Prize. Two thousand people attended the 2011 reading.

List of winners
2022 – Anthony Joseph, Sonnets for Albert
2021 – Joelle Taylor, C+nto & Othered Poems
2020 – Bhanu Kapil, How to Wash a Heart
2019 – Roger Robinson, A Portable Paradise
2018 – Hannah Sullivan, Three Poems
2017 – Ocean Vuong, Night Sky with Exit Wounds
2016 – Jacob Polley, Jackself
2015 – Sarah Howe, Loop of Jade
2014 – David Harsent, Fire Songs
2013 – Sinéad Morrissey, Parallax
2012 – Sharon Olds, Stag's Leap
2011 – John Burnside, Black Cat Bone
2010 – Derek Walcott, White Egrets
2009 – Philip Gross, The Water Table
2008 – Jen Hadfield, Nigh-No-Place
2007 – Sean O'Brien, The Drowned Book
2006 – Seamus Heaney, District and Circle
2005 – Carol Ann Duffy, Rapture
2004 – George Szirtes, Reel	
2003 – Don Paterson, Landing Light
2002 – Alice Oswald, Dart	
2001 – Anne Carson, The Beauty of the Husband	
2000 – Michael Longley, The Weather in Japan	
1999 – Hugo Williams, Billy's Rain
1998 – Ted Hughes, Birthday Letters
1997 – Don Paterson, God's Gift to Women
1996 – Les Murray, Subhuman Redneck Poems
1995 – Mark Doty, My Alexandria
1994 – Paul Muldoon, The Annals of Chile
1993 – Ciarán Carson, First Language: Poems

List of judges
2022 – Jean Sprackland, Hannah Lowe and Roger Robinson
2021 – Glyn Maxwell, Caroline Bird and Zaffar Kunial
2020 – Lavinia Greenlaw, Mona Arshi and Andrew McMillan
2019 — John Burnside, Sarah Howe and Nick Makoha
2018 — Clare Pollard, Sinéad Morrissey and Daljit Nagra
2017 — W. N. Herbert, James Lasdun and Helen Mort
2016 — Julia Copus, Ruth Padel and Alan Gillis
2015 – Kei Miller, Pascale Petit and Ahren Warner
2014 – Sean Borodale, Helen Dunmore and Fiona Sampson
2013 – Imtiaz Dharker, Ian Duhig and Vicki Feaver
2012 – Carol Ann Duffy, Michael Longley and David Morley
2011 – Gillian Clarke, Stephen Knight and Dennis O'Driscoll
2010 – Bernardine Evaristo, Anne Stevenson and Michael Symmons Roberts
2009 – Simon Armitage, Colette Bryce and Penelope Shuttle
2008 – Lavinia Greenlaw, Tobias Hill and Andrew Motion
2007 – Sujata Bhatt, W. N. Herbert and Peter Porter
2006 – Sophie Hannah, Gwyneth Lewis and Sean O'Brien
2005 – David Constantine, Kate Clanchy and Jane Draycott
2004 – Douglas Dunn, Paul Farley and Carol Rumens
2003 – David Harsent, Mimi Khalvati and George Szirtes
2002 – Michael Longley
2001 – John Burnside, Helen Dunmore and Maurice Riordan
2000 – Paul Muldoon

Shortlists

2020s 
2022

 Quiet by Victoria Adukwei Bulley (Faber & Faber)
 Ephemeron by Fiona Benson (Cape Poetry)
 Wilder by Jemma Borg (Pavilion Poetry/Liverpool University Press)
 The Thirteenth Angel by Philip Gross (Bloodaxe)
 Sonnets for Albert by Anthony Joseph (Bloomsbury Poetry)
 England's Green by Zaffar Kunial (Faber & Faber)
 Slide by Mark Pajak (Cape Poetry)
 bandit country by James Conor Patterson (Picador Poetry)
 The Room Between Us by Denise Saul (Pavilion Poetry/Liverpool University Press)
 Manorism by Yomi Sode (Penguin Poetry)

2021

 Eat or We Both Starve by Victoria Kennefick (Carcanet)
 Ransom by Michael Symmons Roberts (Jonathan Cape)
 Stones by Kevin Young (Jonathan Cape)
 Men Who Feed Pigeons by Selima Hill (Bloodaxe)
 The Kids by Hannah Lowe (Bloodaxe)
 All the Names Given by Raymond Antrobus (Picador)
 A Blood Condition by Kayo Chingonyi (Chatto & Windus)
 single window by Daniel Sluman (Nine Arches Press)
 C+nto & Othered Poems by Joelle Taylor (Westbourne Press) A Year in the New Life by Jack Underwood (Faber & Faber)2020 Postcolonial Love Poem by Natalie Diaz (Faber & Faber)

 Deformations by Sasha Dugdale (Carcanet Press)
 Shine, Darling by Ella Frears (Offord Road Books)
 RENDANG by Will Harris (Granta Poetry)
 Love Minus Love by Wayne Holloway-Smith (Bloodaxe Books)
 How to Wash a Heart by Bhanu Kapil (Pavilion Poetry) Life Without Air by Daisy Lafarge (Granta Poetry)
 How the Hell Are You by Glyn Maxwell (Picador Poetry)
 Sometimes I Never Suffered by Shane McCrae (Corsair Poetry)
 The Martian’s Regress by J. O. Morgan (Cape Poetry)

2010s2019 After the Formalities by Anthony Anaxagorou (Penned in the Margins)
 Vertigo and Ghost by Fiona Benson (Cape Poetry)
 Surge by Jay Bernard (Chatto & Windus)
 The Mizzy by Paul Farley (Picador)
 Deaf Republic by Ilya Kaminsky (Faber)
 Arias by Sharon Olds (Cape Poetry)
 The Million-Petalled Flower of Being Here by Vidyan Ravinthiran (Bloodaxe)
 Erato by Deryn Rees-Jones (Serendipities)
 A Portable Paradise by Roger Robinson (Peepal Tree Press) The Caiplie Caves by Karen Solie (Picador)2018 Insistence by Ailbhe Darcy
 American Sonnets for My Past and Future Assassins by Terrance Hayes
 Us by Zaffar Kunial
 Feel Free by Nick Laird
 The Distal Point by Fiona Moore
 Europa by Sean O’Brien
 Shrines of Upper Austria by Phoebe Power
 Soho by Richard Scott
 Wade in the Water by Tracy K. Smith
 Three Poems by Hannah Sullivan2017 The Tragic Death of Eleanor Marx by Tara Bergin
 In these Days of Prohibition by Caroline Bird
 The Noise of a Fly by Douglas Dunn
 The Radio by Leontia Flynn
 So Glad I'm Me by Roddy Lumsden
 Mancunia by Michael Symmons Roberts
 Diary of the Last Man by Robert Minhinnick
 The Abandoned Settlements by James Sheard
 All My Mad Mothers by Jacqueline Saphra
 Night Sky with Exit Wounds by Ocean Vuong2016 Void Studies by Rachael Boast
 Measures of Expatriation by Vahni Capildeo
 The Blind Road-Maker by Ian Duhig
 Interference Pattern by J. O. Morgan
 The Seasons of Cullen Church by Bernard O'Donoghue
 Falling Awake by Alice Oswald
 Jackself by Jacob Polley Say Something Back by Denise Riley
 Every Little Sound by Ruby Robinson
 The Remedies by Katharine Towers2015Deep Lane by Mark Doty
 Not in this World by Tracey Herd
 Jutland by Selima Hill
 Loop of Jade by Sarah Howe The World Before Snow by Tim Liardet
 Waiting for the Past by Les Murray
 The Beautiful Librarians by Sean O'Brien
 40 Sonnets by Don Paterson
 Beauty/Beauty by Rebecca Perry
 Citizen: An American Lyric by Claudia Rankine2014 Bright Travellers by Fiona Benson 
 All One Breath by John Burnside
 Faithful and Virtuous Night by Louise Glück
 Fire Songs by David Harsent The Stairwell by Michael Longley 
 Learning to Make an Oud in Nazareth by Ruth Padel 
 Fauverie by Pascale Petit 
 Letter Composed During a Lull in the Fighting by Kevin Powers
 When God is a Traveller by Arundhathi Subramaniam
 I Knew the Bride by Hugo Williams2013The shortlist was announced 23 October 2013.
Speak, Old Parrot by Dannie Abse
At the Time of Partition by Moniza Alvi
Red Doc> by Anne CarsonParallax by Sinéad Morrissey
Division Street by Helen Mort
Ramayana: A Retelling by Daljit Nagra
The Water Stealer by Maurice Riordan
Hill of Doors by Robin Robertson
Drysalter by Michael Symmons Roberts
Bad Machine by George Szirtes

2012

The shortlist was announced 23 October 2012.
The Death of King Arthur by Simon Armitage 
Bee Journal by Sean Borodale
Ice by Gillian Clarke 
The World's Two Smallest Humans by Julia Copus 
The Dark Film by Paul Farley 
P L A C E by Jorie Graham 
The Overhaul by Kathleen Jamie 
Stag's Leap by Sharon Olds
The Havocs by Jacob Polley 
Burying the Wren by Deryn Rees-Jones

2011

Memorial  by Alice Oswald, Faber (withdrawn by the author in protest)
Black Cat Bone by John BurnsideThe Bees by Carol Ann Duffy
Profit and Loss by Leontia Flynn
Night by David Harsent
Armour  by John Kinsella (withdrawn by the author in protest)
Grace by Esther Morgan
Tippoo Sultan's Incredible White-Man-Eating Tiger Toy-Machine!!! by Daljit Nagra 
November  by Sean O'Brien
Farmer's Cross  by Bernard O'Donoghue2010Seeing Stars by Simon Armitage
The Mirabelles by Annie Freud
You by John Haynes
Human Chain by Seamus Heaney
What the Water Gave Me by Pascale Petit
The Wrecking Light by Robin Robertson
Rough Music by Fiona Sampson
Phantom Noise by Brian TurnerWhite Egrets by Derek Walcott
New Light for the Old Dark by Sam Willetts.

2000s

2009
The Sun-fish by Eiléan Ní Chuilleanáin
Continental Shelf by Fred D'Aguiar
Over by Jane Draycott
The Water Table by Philip Gross
Through the Square Window by Sinéad Morrissey
One Secret Thing by Sharon Olds
Weeds & Wild Flowers by Alice Oswald
A Scattering by Christopher Reid
The Burning of the Books and Other Poems by George Szirtes
West End Final by Hugo Williams.

2008
Moniza Alvi, Europa
Peter Bennet, The Glass Swarm
Ciarán Carson, For All We Know
Robert Crawford, Full Volume
Maura Dooley, Life Under Water
Mark Doty, Theories and Apparitions
Jen Hadfield, Nigh-No-Place
Mick Imlah, The Lost Leader
Glyn Maxwell, Hide Now
Stephen Romer, Yellow Studio.

2007
Ian Duhig, The Speed of Dark
Alan Gillis, Hawks and Doves
Sophie Hannah, Pessimism for Beginners
Mimi Khalvati, The Meanest Flower
Frances Leviston, Public Dream
Sarah Maguire, The Pomegranates of Kandahar
Edwin Morgan, A Book of Lives
Sean O'Brien, The Drowned Book
Fiona Sampson, Common Prayer
Matthew Sweeney, Black Moon

2006
Simon Armitage, Tyrannosaurus Rex versus the Corduroy Kid
Paul Farley, Tramp in Flames
Seamus Heaney, District and Circle
W. N. Herbert, Bad Shaman Blues
Jane Hirshfield, After
Tim Liardet, The Blood Choir
Paul Muldoon, Horse Latitudes
Robin Robertson, Swithering
Penelope Shuttle, Redgrove's Wife
Hugo Williams, Dear Room

2005
Polly Clark, Take Me with You
Carol Ann Duffy, Rapture
Helen Farish, Intimates
David Harsent, Legion
Sinéad Morrissey, The State of the Prisons
Alice Oswald, Woods etc
Pascale Petit, The Huntress
Sheenagh Pugh, The Movement of Bodies
John Stammers, Stolen Love Behaviour
Gerard Woodward, We Were Pedestrians

2004
Colette Bryce, The Full Indian Rope Trick
Kathryn Gray, The Never Never
Kathleen Jamie, The Tree House
Michael Longley, Snow Water
Ruth Padel, The Soho Leopard
Tom Paulin, The Road to Inver
Peter Porter, Afterburner
Michael Symmons Roberts, Corpus
George Szirtes, Reel
John Hartley Williams, Blues

2003
Billy Collins, Nine Horses
John F. Deane, Manhandling the Deity
Ian Duhig, The Lammas Hireling
Lavinia Greenlaw, Minsk
Jamie McKendrick, Ink Stone
Bernard O'Donoghue, Outiving
Don Paterson, Landing Light
Jacob Polley, The Brink
Christopher Reid, For and After
Jean Sprackland, Hard Water

2002
Simon Armitage, The Universal Home Doctor
John Burnside, The Light Trap
Paul Farley, The Ice Age
David Harsent, Marriage
Geoffrey Hill, The Orchards of Syon
E. A. Markham, A Rough Climate
Sinéad Morrissey, Between Here and There
Paul Muldoon, Moy Sand and Gravel
Alice Oswald, Dart
Ruth Padel, Voodoo Shop

2001
Gillian Allnutt, Lintel
Charles Boyle, The Age of Cardboard and String
Anne Carson, The Beauty of the Husband
Seamus Heaney, Electric Light
Geoffrey Hill – Speech! Speech!
Selima Hill, Bunny
James Lasdun, Landscape with Chainsaw
Sean O'Brien, Downriver
Pascale Petit, The Zoo Father
Michael Symmons Roberts, Burning Babylon

See also
 List of British literary awards
 List of poetry awards
 List of literary awards
 English poetry
 English literature
 British literature
 List of years in literature
 List of years in poetry

Notes

External links
T.S. Eliot Prize website

 
1993 establishments in the United Kingdom
Awards established in 1993
British poetry awards
T. S. Eliot